In mathematics, a symplectic integrator (SI) is a numerical integration scheme for Hamiltonian systems. Symplectic integrators form the subclass of geometric integrators which, by definition, are canonical transformations. They are widely used in nonlinear dynamics, molecular dynamics, discrete element methods, accelerator physics, plasma physics, quantum physics, and celestial mechanics.

Introduction 

Symplectic integrators are designed for the numerical solution of Hamilton's equations, which read

The set of position and momentum coordinates  are called canonical coordinates.
(See Hamiltonian mechanics for more background.)

The time evolution of Hamilton's equations is a symplectomorphism, meaning that it conserves the symplectic 2-form . A numerical scheme is a symplectic integrator if it also conserves this 2-form.

Symplectic integrators also might possess, as a conserved quantity, a Hamiltonian which is slightly perturbed from the original one (only true for a small class of simple cases). By virtue of these advantages, the SI scheme has been widely applied to the calculations of long-term evolution of chaotic Hamiltonian systems ranging from the Kepler problem to the classical and semi-classical simulations in molecular dynamics.

Most of the usual numerical methods, like the primitive Euler scheme and the classical Runge–Kutta scheme, are not symplectic integrators.

Methods for constructing symplectic algorithms

Splitting methods for separable Hamiltonians 

A widely used class of symplectic integrators is formed by the splitting methods.

Assume that the Hamiltonian is separable, meaning that it can be written in the form

This happens frequently in Hamiltonian mechanics, with T being the kinetic energy and V the potential energy.

For the notational simplicity, let us introduce the symbol  to denote the canonical coordinates 
including both the position and momentum coordinates. Then, the set of the Hamilton's equations given in the introduction can be expressed in a single expression as

where  is a Poisson bracket. Furthermore, by introducing an operator , which returns a Poisson bracket of the operand with the Hamiltonian, the expression of the Hamilton's equation can be further simplified to

The formal solution of this set of equations is given as a matrix exponential:

When the Hamiltonian has the form of equation, the solution is equivalent to

The SI scheme approximates the time-evolution operator  in the formal solution by a product of operators as

Note that each of the operators  and  provides a symplectic map, so their product appearing in the right-hand side of  also constitutes a symplectic map.

Since  for all , we can conclude that

By using a Taylor series,  can be expressed as

where  is an arbitrary real number.

In concrete terms,  gives the mapping

and  gives

Note that both of these maps are practically computable.

Examples 
The simplified form of the equations (in executed order) are:

After converting into Lagrangian coordinates:

Several symplectic integrators are given below. An illustrative way to use them is to consider a particle with position  and momentum .

To apply a timestep with values  to the particle, carry out the following steps:

Iteratively:
 Update the position  of the particle by adding to it its (previously updated) velocity  multiplied by 
 Update the velocity  of the particle by adding to it its acceleration (at updated position) multiplied by

A first-order example 

Note that the algorithm above does not work if time-reversibility is needed. The algorithm has to be implemented in two parts, one for positive time steps, one for negative time steps.

A second-order example 

Since , the algorithm above is symmetric in time. There are 3 steps to the algorithm, and step 1 and 3 are exactly the same, so the positive time version can be used for negative time.

A third-order example 

A third-order symplectic integrator (with ) was discovered by Ronald Ruth in 1983.
One of the many solutions is given by

A fourth-order example 
A fourth-order integrator (with ) was also discovered by Ruth in 1983 and distributed privately to the particle-accelerator community at that time.  This was described in a lively review article by Forest.
This fourth-order integrator was published in 1990 by Forest and Ruth and also independently discovered by two other groups around that same time.

To determine these coefficients, the Baker–Campbell–Hausdorff formula can be used. Yoshida, in particular, gives an elegant derivation of coefficients for higher-order integrators. Later on, Blanes and Moan further developed partitioned Runge–Kutta methods for the integration of systems with separable Hamiltonians with very small error constants.

Splitting methods for general nonseparable Hamiltonians 
General nonseparable Hamiltonians can also be explicitly and symplectically integrated.

To do so, Tao introduced a restraint that binds two copies of phase space together to enable an explicit splitting of such systems.

Exact solutions of all three sub-Hamiltonians can be explicitly obtained: both  solutions correspond to shifts of mismatched position and momentum, and  corresponds to a linear transformation. To symplectically simulate the system, one simply composes these solution maps.

Applications

In plasma physics 
In recent decades symplectic integrator in plasma physics has become an active research topic, because straightforward applications of the standard symplectic methods do not suit the need of large-scale plasma simulations enabled by the peta- to exa-scale computing hardware. Special symplectic algorithms need to be customarily designed, tapping into the special structures of physics problem under investigation. One such example is the charged particle dynamics in an electromagnetic field. With the canonical symplectic structure, the Hamiltonian of the dynamics is  whose -dependence and -dependence are not separable, and standard explicit symplectic methods do not apply. For large-scale simulations on massively parallel clusters, however, explicit methods are preferred. 
To overcome this difficulty, we can explore the specific way that the -dependence and -dependence are entangled in this Hamiltonian, and try to design a symplectic algorithm just for this or this type of problem. This is what is used in the canonical symplectic particle-in-cell (PIC) algorithm. To build high order explicit methods, we further note that the -dependence and -dependence in this  are product-separable, 2nd and 3rd order explicit symplectic algorithms can be constructed using generating functions, and arbitrarily high-order explicit symplectic integrators for time-dependent electromagnetic fields can also be constructed using Runge-Kutta techniques.

A more elegant and versatile alternative is to look at the following non-canonical symplectic structure of the problem,  Here  is a non-constant non-canonical symplectic form. General symplectic integrator for non-constant non-canonical symplectic structure, explicit or implicit, is not known to exist. However, for this specific problem, a family of high-order explicit non-canonical symplectic integrators can be constructed using the He splitting method. Splitting  into 4 parts,  we find serendipitously that for each subsystem, e.g.,  and  the solution map can be written down explicitly and calculated exactly. Then explicit high-order non-canonical symplectic algorithms can be constructed using different compositions. Let  and  denote the exact solution maps for the 4 subsystems. A 1st-order symplectic scheme is  A symmetric 2nd-order symplectic scheme is,  which is a customarily modified Strang splitting. A -th order scheme can be constructed from a -th order scheme using the method of triple jump,  The He splitting method is one of key techniques used in the structure-preserving geometric particle-in-cell (PIC) algorithms.

See also 
 Energy drift
 Multisymplectic integrator
 Variational integrator
 Verlet integration

References 

 
 
 

Numerical differential equations
Hamiltonian mechanics